Peschanka is a rural locality (a selo) and the administrative center of Peschanskoye Rural Settlement, Starooskolsky District, Belgorod Oblast, Russia. The population was 2,149 as of 2010. There are 36 streets.

Geography 
Peschanka is located 9 km west of Stary Oskol (the district's administrative centre) by road. Yezdotsky is the nearest rural locality.

References 

Rural localities in Starooskolsky District